Lee Jae-jin is a Korean name consisting of the family name Lee and the given name Jae-jin, and may also refer to:

 Lee Jae-jin (badminton) (born 1983), South Korean badminton player
 Lee Jaijin (musician, born 1979), South Korean musician and member of Sechs Kies
 Lee Jae-jin (musician, born 1991), South Korean musician and member of F.T. Island